Carlos Velázquez may refer to:

Carlos Velázquez (footballer) (born 1984), Mexican footballer
Carlos Velázquez (baseball) (1948–2000), Puerto Rican Major League Baseball pitcher
Carlos Velázquez (pentathlete) (born 1925), Argentina pentathlete

See also
Velazquez
Carlos Velásquez (born 1984), Puerto Rican boxer